The 2013 Tour of Flanders was the 97th edition of the Tour of Flanders single-day cycling race, known as one of the Monument classics.

The race was won for the second time by  rider Fabian Cancellara, after he made a solo attack with around  remaining of the race, on the race's final cobbled climb of the Paterberg. Second place went to Peter Sagan of the  team, while third place went to 's Jürgen Roelandts; both of those riders had been in a group with Cancellara before his move, and eventually finished nearly one-and-a-half minutes behind Cancellara.

Route

Teams
As the Tour of Flanders was a UCI World Tour event, all UCI ProTeams were invited automatically and obligated to send a squad. Originally, race organisers had been planning to have the eighteen ProTeams invited to the race, with seven other squads given wildcard places, and as such, would have formed the event's 25-team peloton.  subsequently regained their ProTour status after an appeal to the Court of Arbitration for Sport. Rather than removing one team from the race to accommodate , race organisers sought approval from the Union Cycliste Internationale to invite 26 teams of 8 riders, and a maximum peloton of 208 riders; this proposal was granted prior to the race.

The 26 teams that competed in the race were:

Results

References

External links

Tour of Flanders
Tour of Flanders
Tour of Flanders